Route 108 or Highway 108 can refer to multiple roads:

Canada
 New Brunswick Route 108
 Ontario Highway 108
 Prince Edward Island Route 108
 Quebec Route 108

China
 China National Highway 108

Costa Rica
 National Route 108

India
 National Highway 108 (India)

Japan
 Route 108 (Japan)

Philippines
 N108 highway (Philippines)

United States
 Alabama State Route 108
 Arkansas Highway 108
 California State Route 108
 Connecticut Route 108
 Florida State Road 108 (pre-1945) (former)
 Georgia State Route 108
 Illinois Route 108
 Iowa Highway 108 (former)
 K-108 (Kansas highway) (former)
 Kentucky Route 108
 Louisiana Highway 108
 Maine State Route 108
 Maryland Route 108
Maryland Route 108A
Maryland Route 108H
 Massachusetts Route 108
 M-108 (Michigan highway) (former)
 Minnesota State Highway 108
 Missouri Route 108
 Nebraska Highway 108 (former)
 New Hampshire Route 108
 County Route 108 (Bergen County, New Jersey)
 New Mexico State Road 108
 New York State Route 108
 County Route 108 (Cayuga County, New York)
County Route 108A (Cortland County, New York)
County Route 108B (Cortland County, New York)
 County Route 108 (Fulton County, New York)
 County Route 108 (Montgomery County, New York)
 County Route 108 (Niagara County, New York)
 County Route 108 (Onondaga County, New York)
 County Route 108 (Rockland County, New York)
 County Route 108 (Saratoga County, New York)
 County Route 108 (Seneca County, New York)
 County Route 108 (Suffolk County, New York)
 County Route 108 (Sullivan County, New York)
 County Route 108 (Wayne County, New York)
 County Route 108 (Westchester County, New York)
  North Carolina Highway 108
 Ohio State Route 108
 Oklahoma State Highway 108
 Pennsylvania Route 108
 Rhode Island Route 108
 Tennessee State Route 108
 Texas State Highway 108
 Texas State Highway Loop 108
 Texas State Highway Spur 108
 Texas State Highway Spur 108 (1940–1942) (former)
 Farm to Market Road 108
 Utah State Route 108
 Vermont Route 108
 Virginia State Route 108
 Virginia State Route 108 (1923-1928) (former)
 Virginia State Route 108 (1928-1932) (former)
 Washington State Route 108
 Wisconsin Highway 108

Territories
 Puerto Rico Highway 108
 U.S. Virgin Islands Highway 108

See also
108 (number)
A108 road (Great Britain)
B108 road
D108 road (Croatia)
P108
R108 road (Ireland)